10th AFCA Awards

Best Film: 
Boyhood

The 10th Austin Film Critics Association Awards, honoring the best in filmmaking for 2014, were announced on December 17, 2014.

Top 10 Films 
 Boyhood
 Whiplash
 The Grand Budapest Hotel
 Birdman
 Snowpiercer
 Nightcrawler
 Selma
 The Imitation Game
 Inherent Vice
 Gone Girl

Winners
 Best Film:
 Boyhood
 Best Director:
 Richard Linklater – Boyhood
 Best Actor:
 Jake Gyllenhaal – Nightcrawler
 Best Actress:
 Rosamund Pike – Gone Girl
 Best Supporting Actor:
 J. K. Simmons – Whiplash
 Best Supporting Actress:
 Patricia Arquette – Boyhood
 Best Original Screenplay:
 Nightcrawler – Dan Gilroy
 Best Adapted Screenplay:
 Gone Girl – Gillian Flynn
 Best Cinematography:
 Birdman – Emmanuel Lubezki
 Best Original Score:
 Birdman – Antonio Sánchez
 Best Foreign Language Film:
 Force Majeure • Sweden
 Best Documentary:
 Citizenfour
 Best Animated Feature:
 The LEGO Movie
 Best First Film:
 Dan Gilroy – Nightcrawler
 Breakthrough Artist Award:
 Jennifer Kent – The Babadook
 Austin Film Award:
 Boyhood – Richard Linklater
 Special Honorary Award:
 Gary Poulter for his outstanding performance in Joe

References

External links
 IMDb page
 Official website

2014 film awards
2014
2014 in Texas